Kelly Greenbank (born 17 November 1955) is a Canadian-born Austrian former professional ice hockey right winger.

Greenbank was drafted 34th overall by the Montreal Canadiens in the 1975 NHL Amateur Draft and 20th overall by the Cleveland Crusaders in the 1975 WHA Amateur Draft but never played in either league. Instead, he played in the American Hockey League for the Nova Scotia Voyageurs and the Central Hockey League for the Fort Worth Texans and the Oklahoma City Stars between 1975 and 1980.

In 1980, Greenbank moved to Austria to sign for VEU Feldkirch. He remained with Feldkirch right up until his retirement in 1992, playing thirteen seasons with the team. He became an Austrian citizen during his spell and became eligible to play for the Austrian national team, with whom he competed in the men's tournaments at the 1984 Winter Olympics and the 1988 Winter Olympics.

Career statistics

References

External links
 

1955 births
Living people
Austrian ice hockey right wingers
Brandon Wheat Kings players
Cleveland Crusaders draft picks
Fort Worth Texans players
Olympic ice hockey players of Austria
Ice hockey people from Saskatchewan
Ice hockey players at the 1984 Winter Olympics
Ice hockey players at the 1988 Winter Olympics
Montreal Canadiens draft picks
Nova Scotia Voyageurs players
Oklahoma City Stars players
People from Moosomin, Saskatchewan
Rhode Island Reds players
VEU Feldkirch players
Winnipeg Clubs players